"Habibi" (meaning "my love" in Arabic) is a song by Swedish rappers Ricky Rich and ARAM Mafia. It peaked at number 29 of Sverigetopplistan, the official Swedish singles chart and spending 21 weeks in the chart. It became viral on TikTok in 2021 and also charted in Germany, Austria and Switzerland becoming Ricky Rich as well as ARAM Mafia's first ever international hit.

An official music video was released for the song directed by Viktor Blomdahl that featured Ricky Rich and actress and dancer Jeamy Blessed.

.

Charts

References

2017 songs
2017 singles